The Cessnock Goannas Rugby League Football Club is an Australian rugby league football club based in Cessnock, New South Wales, formed in 1911. They currently play in the Newcastle Rugby League competition

Notable Rugby League Juniors
Matthew Johns (1992-02 Newcastle Knights, Wigan Warriors & Cronulla)
Andrew Johns (1993-05 Newcastle Knights)
Bill Peden (1994-02 Newcastle Knights)
Joel Edwards (2010- Newcastle Knights & Canberra Raiders)
Isaac Gordon (2010-12 Cronulla Sharks)
Chris Adams (2012 Newcastle Knights)
Brodie Jones (2020-current) Newcastle Knights
Brayden Musgrove (2021  Newcastle Knights)

Honours 
First Grade Premierships:1941, 1950, 1954, 1955, 1960, 1972, 1977, 2003, 2020

Reserve Grade Premierships:1934, 1951, 1952, 1954, 1957, 1958, 1964, 1977, 1978, 1980.

Third Grade Premierships: 1957

See also

List of rugby league clubs in Australia
Newcastle Rugby League
 Cessnock

References

External links

Rugby clubs established in 1911
1911 establishments in Australia
Rugby league teams in Newcastle, New South Wales